The Expanse is an American science fiction television series that premiered on December 14, 2015, on Syfy. The series was developed by Mark Fergus and Hawk Ostby, based on the series of novels by Daniel Abraham and Ty Franck, writing under the pseudonym James S. A. Corey. Set in a future where humanity has colonized the Solar System, it follows United Nations executive Chrisjen Avasarala (Shohreh Aghdashloo), police detective Josephus Miller (Thomas Jane), and ship's officer James Holden (Steven Strait) and his crew as they unravel a conspiracy that threatens peace in the system and the survival of humanity.

On May 11, 2018, Syfy canceled the series after three seasons. However, on May 26, Amazon Video announced it had picked up the series for a fourth season. In July 2019, Amazon renewed the series for a fifth season, which premiered on December 15, 2020. In November 2020, the series was renewed by Amazon for a sixth and final season, which premiered on December 10, 2021.

Series overview

Episodes

Season 1 (2015–16) 
Season 1 roughly follows the events of the first half of the book Leviathan Wakes.

Season 2 (2017) 
Season 2 concludes the events of the book Leviathan Wakes and starts plotlines from Caliban's War, as well as adapting the short story "Drive".

Season 3 (2018) 
Season 3 concludes the plot lines from Caliban's War in episodes 1–6 and uses material from Abaddon's Gate for the remaining episodes.

Season 4 (2019) 
Season 4 is almost entirely adapted from the fourth book, Cibola Burn, with the novella "Gods of Risk" providing source material for episode 2.

Webisodes

The Expanse: One Ship (2021–22)
The Expanse: One Ship is a series of webisodes released alongside the sixth season. The episodes are available in the X-Ray bonus content section via Prime Video and feature "small little character moments" aimed to provide more depth to the mainline story.

Ratings

Season 1

Season 2

Season 3

References

External links
  on Syfy
 The Expanse on Amazon Prime Video
 

Episodes
Expanse